The International Emmy Award for Best Drama Series is presented by the International Academy of Television Arts & Sciences (IATAS) during the International Emmy Awards ceremony. The category is described on the official International Academy website as being open to drama series which are "a dramatic production in which theme, storyline, and main characters are presented under the same title, with the intention to develop beyond a first season." The award was first given in 2002, for the awards covering programmes screened in 2001.

Rules & regulations 
Under the rules of the International Academy, the prize is awarded to a dramatic production in which the theme, plot and main characters are presented under the same title. The program should fit the minimum format length of a televised half-hour time slot and that it has been broadcast between the eligibility period. If the program is part of an anthology series (i.e. each episode presents a different story and a different set of characters), episodes entering this category should be less than, or equal to, one hour in length. Two episodes must be submitted.

Winners and nominees

2000s

2010s

2020s

Multiple nominations  
TV series

 

Country

Multiple wins
TV series

Country

References

External links
 2013 Emmy Awards
 International Emmy Awards

Drama